Henry Edison Canine (July 28, 1901 – June 12, 1939) was an American football coach and physical education instructor. Canine received national recognition from his master's thesis, where he advocated for a lighter-weight discus in high school competition. His suggestion was adopted by the National High School Athletic Association.

Canine was the second head football coach at Adams State College—now known as Adams State University—in Alamosa, Colorado and he held that position for the 1938 season. His coaching record at Adams State was 1–4–1.

Canine played at the collegiate level at the University of Idaho. He married Mary Hagen in June 1928.  Before going to the college level, Canine coached at the high school level in Aledo, Illinois for 11 years while also teaching mathematics.

Canine died on June 12, 1939, the summer after his first year of coaching at the Mayo Clinic in Rochester, Minnesota.

Head coaching record

References

External links
 

1901 births
1939 deaths
Adams State Grizzlies football coaches
Idaho Vandals football players
Idaho Vandals men's basketball players
Schoolteachers from Illinois
People from Emmetsburg, Iowa